Ride with the Devil may refer to:

 Ride with the Devil (film), a 1999 film directed by Ang Lee
 Ride with the Devil (TV series), a New Zealand drama series
 Ride with the Devil, a 1999 film starring and produced by Scott Shaw
 "Ride with the Devil", a song composed by The Gun